Hana Gabrielle Pestle (born July 11, 1989), known mononymously as Hana (stylized in all caps), is an American musician, singer-songwriter and record producer. She is currently based in Los Angeles.

Hana began working on music in 2006, with the help of producers and writers Ben Moody and Michael "Fish" Herring. Her early work was largely acoustic-based, utilizing the guitar, which Hana plays. During this period, she recorded under her full name Hana Pestle. As Hana Pestle, she released three extended plays—Hana Pestle (2008), Live in the Studio (2009), and For the Sky (2011)—and one full-length album titled This Way (2009).

In 2013, upon befriending producer BloodPop, Hana chose to take a break from recording to focus on learning music production. Dissatisfied with the music she was making, she decided to rebrand herself and change the direction of her music. In 2015, she re-emerged on the music scene with the single "Clay"; now recording under the mononym Hana. Her debut body of work as Hana, the self-titled Hana EP (2016), saw her explore a more electronic style.

In November 2019, Hana released her second studio album, Hanadriel. The album was made in four weeks, and the creation process was live streamed by Hana via Twitch.

In addition to her solo work, Hana is also known for her frequent work with musician Grimes. She has performed as a live backing vocalist and band member for Grimes, and the pair have collaborated on songs and music videos.

Early life
Hana Pestle was born July 11, 1989, in Atlanta, Georgia. She moved to Salt Lake City, Utah when she was six years old, and to Billings, Montana, when she was eight. Hana received her first guitar, which her parents bought from a garage sale, as a Christmas present when she was in fifth grade. Her parents also got her a piano around the same time. During her youth she took guitar and vocal lessons, and performed in choirs. Hana began performing live at the age of fourteen. She would play at local cafés and book stores in Billings, and at the local farmers' market each weekend.

Career

2005–11: Career beginnings, Hana Pestle, This Way and For the Sky
In 2005, a video of Hana performing in Montana reached producers and writers Michael "Fish" Herring and Ben Moody, who subsequently decided they wanted to work with her. Upon discovering Hana, Moody reportedly said of her, "It only took Hana singing one song and I was sold. I have never in my life been more in awe of such a breathtaking natural talent". Hana traveled with her family to Los Angeles to meet with Moody and Herring in 2005, upon which they recorded some demos. She began working with the pair on her debut album in April 2006, while she was a senior in high school. Hana contributed backing vocals to the song "This Time" by Céline Dion, from Dion's 2007 album Taking Chances.

Hana shopped for a record label during 2007, sending her music to labels in Los Angeles and New York. In May 2008, Hana revealed that she had been signed to Ben Moody's new record label, FNR Records. She was the first artist signed to the label, which was created specially to release her debut album. Later that month, she released her first recording effort, an extended play titled Hana Pestle. At the time, Hana was recording under her full name. The self-titled EP is composed of three original songs—"These Two Hands", "Just a Phase", and "Together Forever"—and a cover of Leonard Cohen's "Hallelujah". A music video was released for "These Two Hands".

In 2008, Hana featured on a new version of Ben Moody's song "Everything Burns". She also contributed backing vocals to all tracks on Moody's debut album All for This, which was released in 2009.

In December 2008, Hana shared a song titled "Need", and began campaigning to have it included in the film The Twilight Saga: New Moon. The ultimately unsuccessful campaign was referred to as "Need for New Moon". "Need" was officially released as Hana's debut single in June 2009. The song's accompanying music video was directed by Norwood Cheek. Also in June 2009, Hana released an extended play titled Live in the Studio. It features live versions of seven tracks, including "These Two Hands" and "Just a Phase" from the Hana Pestle EP, a cover of Radiohead's "Creep", and four new songs from Hana's then-upcoming album. Hana's debut album, This Way, was released in September 2009 through FNR Records. It was produced by Ben Moody and Michael Herring, and incorporates string orchestras; the strings were arranged by composer David Campbell.

In 2011, Hana entered and won a contest held by American rock band Incubus. The contest involved recording a version of the band's song "Promises, Promises"—which had yet to be released—based only on the sheet music. Upon winning, Hana got to perform the song live alongside Incubus members Mike Einziger and Chris Kilmore in July 2011.

Hana released her third extended play, For the Sky, in September 2011. The EP is composed of five original songs.

From 2008–2012, Hana shared various covers via YouTube and SoundCloud. Some of the songs she covered include "First Day of My Life" by Bright Eyes, "Hotel California" by the Eagles, "Back to Black" by Amy Winehouse, "We Found Love" by Rihanna, "Always Be My Baby" by Mariah Carey, "If You Return" by Maximum Balloon, "Eyes Wide Open" by Gotye, "Landslide" by Fleetwood Mac, "River" by Joni Mitchell, and "Wintersong" by Sarah McLachlan.

2013–2018: Change in direction & Hana
In 2013, Hana met music producer BloodPop and talked to him about her career. Subsequently, she decided to take a break to learn music production and change the direction of her music. She has since stated that she was dissatisfied with her earlier work. She attributes this to a lack of creative control, saying of her former producers, "they just took my songs and produced them in the way they thought made sense; I never had a heart to heart connection with the production of the songs". Hana chose to take down her social media accounts and website, as well as removing most of her earlier music from the internet, in order to rebrand herself from a clean slate.

After taking a break, Hana re-emerged in 2015, now recording under just her first name. Now producing her own music, Hana changed her style to a more synth-oriented pop sound. In May 2015, she released "Clay"—her first song as Hana—on SoundCloud. The song received praise from fellow female singer-songwriters Grimes and Lorde. Around this time, Hana accompanied Grimes as part of the opening act for Lana Del Rey's Endless Summer Tour. On the final two dates of the tour, Hana played "Clay" during Grimes' set. A video of the performance was filmed by Grimes and James Brooks and shared through YouTube to promote the song. In July 2015, Nylon premiered Hana's second song since her rebrand, "Avalanche".

Hana toured with musician Grimes throughout 2016. She opened for Grimes on the European dates of her AC!D Reign Tour, which took place from February through March. Later that year, the pair embarked on Grimes' March of the Pugs Tour, during which Hana performed alongside Grimes as a backing vocalist and band member.

In March 2016, The Fader premiered Hana's third new single, "Underwater", alongside a video shot on tour. She released her first body of work since rebranding, the self-titled EP HANA, on March 25, 2016.

In October 2016, Hana and Grimes released a video series titled The AC!D Reign Chronicles. It is composed of seven music videos filmed over two weeks in Europe. The songs included are Hana's "Underwater", "Chimera", and "Avalanche" from her Hana EP, and four tracks from Grimes' album Art Angels. The individual music videos were published to Hana and Grimes' respective YouTube channels, and a "Director's Cut" containing all seven videos in their "intended order" was uploaded to Grimes' channel.

In 2017, Hana and Grimes collaborated on a cover of Tegan and Sara's song "Dark Come Soon". They contributed the track to the compilation Tegan and Sara Present the Con X: Covers, which consists of cover versions of the tracks from Tegan and Sara's album The Con. Grimes and Hana are credited as "Trashique".

In July 2018, Hana shared a cover of "Here Comes the Rain Again" by Eurythmics via SoundCloud. She had previously performed the song during live shows, and wanted to release her version so that it could "exist outside a venue".

In November 2018, Hana featured on Grimes' single "We Appreciate Power". She also produced a "nightcore" remix of the song.

2019–2020: Hanadriel
On August 14, 2019, Hana released a new single titled "Black Hole". It was her first release as lead artist since her self-titled EP in 2016. According to Hana, it is an older song that she had wanted to release for a long time.

On September 20, 2019, Hana announced that she would be live streaming the making of her upcoming second album via Twitch. The live streams took place over the course of the following four weeks. The album, Hanadriel, was released on November 6, 2019.

Between October 2019 and April 2020, Hana released several tracks with other artists. In October 2019, she and Anamanaguchi released the collaboration "On My Own", and she featured on the track "Nothing Like You" by Gryffin and Droeloe. In December 2019, she appeared alongside producer Durante on the track "Days Pass", which was released as part of the compilation Anjunadeep 11. She featured on the single "Ghosts" by Tchami in February 2020. Hana and Durante collaborated again in 2020 on the tracks "13 Voices" and "Starglow", which appeared on the compilation The Anjunadeep Edition 300, released in April. The following May, Hana and Durante's three collaborative tracks were released together on an extended play titled 13 Voices EP. The EP also features extended versions of each track.

On October 30, 2020, Hana released a new single titled "So & So".

Personal life 
Hana has dated American musician and producer BloodPop since May 2013. They met in a recording session.

Discography

Studio albums

Extended plays

Singles

As lead artist

As featured artist

Guest appearances

Remixes

Special releases

Music videos

As lead artist

As featured artist

Guest appearances

Other contributions

References

1989 births
Living people
American women rock singers
Musicians from Atlanta
People from Billings, Montana
21st-century American singers
21st-century American women singers